Joseph-Napoléon Francoeur (December 13, 1880 – July 25, 1965) was a lawyer, judge and political figure in Quebec. He represented Lotbinière in the Legislative Assembly of Quebec from 1908 to 1936 and Lotbinière in the House of Commons of Canada from 1937 to 1940 as a Liberal. Francoeur was Speaker of the Legislative Assembly from 1919 to 1928.

He was born in Cap-Saint-Ignace, Quebec, the son of Auguste Francoeur and Avila Caron, and was educated at the Séminaire de Québec and the Université Laval. He was admitted to the Quebec bar in 1904 and set up practice in Quebec City. Francoeur practised in partnership with Philippe-Auguste Choquette, Antonin Galipeault and Thomas Vien, among others. In 1913, he was named King's Counsel.

He ran unsuccessfully for a seat in the Quebec assembly in 1904 before being elected in 1908. In 1918, he prepared the Francœur Motion in response to anti-Quebec sentiment following the conscription crisis during World War I. Francoeur served in the provincial cabinet as Minister of Public Works and Labour from 1930 to 1931, as Minister of Public Works from 1931 to 1936 and as Minister of Mines and Minister of Labour from 1935 to 1936. He was defeated when he ran for reelection to the provincial assembly in 1936.

Francoeur was elected to the House of Commons in a 1937 by-election held following the death of Joseph-Achille Verville. He resigned his seat in 1940 after he was named judge in the Court of King's Bench, serving until 1945. He died in Quebec City at the age of 84.

His brother Joseph-Achille also served in the Quebec assembly.

References

External links 
 
 

Presidents of the National Assembly of Quebec
Members of the House of Commons of Canada from Quebec
Liberal Party of Canada MPs
Quebec Liberal Party MNAs
Judges in Quebec
1880 births
1965 deaths
People from Chaudière-Appalaches
Université Laval alumni
Canadian King's Counsel